The Long Island City station is a rail terminal of the Long Island Rail Road in the Hunters Point and Long Island City neighborhoods of Queens, New York City. Located within the City Terminal Zone at Borden Avenue and Second Street, it is the westernmost LIRR station in Queens and the end of both the Main Line and Montauk Branch. The station consists of one passenger platform located at ground level and is wheelchair accessible.

Service
The station is served only during weekday rush hours in the peak direction by diesel trains from the Oyster Bay, Montauk, or Port Jefferson Branches via the Main Line. Until November 2012, some LIRR trains also ran via the Lower Montauk Branch to and from this station. Due to this limited service, it gets only 101 riders per week, making it the second least used LIRR station in New York City (after Mets–Willets Point).

History
This station was built on June 26, 1854, and rebuilt seven times during the 19th century. On December 18, 1902, both the two-story station building and office building owned by the LIRR burned down. The rebuilt, and fire-proof, station opened on April 26, 1903. Electric service to the station began on June 16, 1910.

Before the East River Tunnels were built, this station served as the terminus for Manhattan-bound passengers from Long Island, who took ferries to the East Side of Manhattan, specifically to the East 34th Street Ferry Landing in Murray Hill, and the James Slip Ferry Port in what is today part of the Two Bridges section of Lower Manhattan. The passenger ferry service was abandoned on March 3, 1925.  A track spur split from the Montauk Branch east of the Long Island City station, running along the south border of the station before curving north to the North Shore Freight Branch running between 48th and 49th Avenues, where there were connections to car floats at what is today the Gantry Plaza State Park. These car floats carried freight trains to and from Manhattan and New Jersey until the mid-20th century. Today, ferry service is operated by NYC Ferry.

The station house was torn down again in 1939 for construction of the Queens–Midtown Tunnel, but continued to operate as an active station throughout the tunnel's construction and opening.

Station layout
This station has 13 tracks and three concrete high-level island platforms. The northernmost platform, Platform A, is two cars long and is accessible from Borden Avenue just west of Fifth Street. Platforms B and C are located within the secure area of the rail yard.

All tracks without platforms are used for train storage. The southernmost six tracks are powered by third rail, while the remaining are only used by diesel-powered trains.

Gallery

References

External links

 Station from Google Maps Street View
Northern platform (Tracks 2 & 3) from Google Maps Street View
Entrance to Northern platform (Tracks 2 & 3) from Google Maps Street View

Long Island Rail Road stations in New York City
Railroad terminals in New York City
Railway stations in Queens, New York
Railway stations in the United States opened in 1854
Long Island City
1854 establishments in New York (state)